Anna Maria Casali (born 1929) is a Sammarinese former politician. She was one of four women elected to the Grand and General Council in 1974, becoming its first female members.

Biography
Casali was born in 1929, the third child of Alvaro Casali, a dentist and politician. She grew up in Forlì in Italy and Toulouse in France, where her father had moved for work. She returned to San Marino and worked as a teacher.

A member of the Sammarinese Communist Party, Casali was elected to the Grand and General Council in the 1974 elections, becoming one of the first group of female MPs.

References

1929 births
Living people
Sammarinese educators
Sammarinese women in politics
Members of the Grand and General Council
Sammarinese Communist Party politicians